Jack "Kid" Lester (2 May 1891 – 1916) was an American heavyweight boxer.

Biography
He was born in Calumet, Michigan as Jack Jubeck on May 2, 1891 to Polish parents. He was raised in Cle Elum, Washington.

Lester's record was fairly unspectacular, though his knockout ratio in winning bouts was fairly high. His first manager was Harry Burns, but in 1910, ex-boxing champion Tommy Burns took Lester on. Tommy Burns sent Lester to Australia in 1911 to gain fight experience, and in September that year he beat Bill Lang, the Australian heavyweight champion, by points. While in Australia Lester and Burns's relationship became strained and Lester dropped Burns for Hugh MacIntosh. Lester spent the entirety of 1912 in Australia, but by March 1913 Lester was back in the States and fighting in California. Towards the end of his career he lost two matches to Light Heavyweight champion Jack Dillon.

He died in 1916 at the age of 26.

Professional boxing record

References
Best of Times, movie 1986

External links
boxrec.com Jack Lester biography
Cyber Boxing Zone Jack Lester record

1891 births
1916 deaths
Boxers from Michigan
Heavyweight boxers
People from Calumet, Michigan
Sportspeople from Michigan
American male boxers
People from Cle Elum, Washington